National Secular Conference (NSC) is an Indian political party from Kerala. P. T. A. Rahim is the state president of National Secular Conference (NSC). 
In early 2011 with the support of LDF, under the leadership of  P. T. A. Rahim a new party, National Secular Conference (NSC) was formed to protect the rights of Dalits, religious minorities and other backward sections of people. Without long historical background, NSC flourished in different parts of Kerala by utilising its secular mottos. Jaleel Punalur is the state organising secretary of NSC. The party have roots in southern region of the state, with many members in Alappuzha, Kollam, and Trivandrum districts.

References 

Political parties in Kerala
Political parties established in 2011
2011 establishments in Kerala